Informatics is the study of the structure, behaviour, and interactions of natural and engineered computational systems.

Informatics may refer to:
 Computer science, the scientific study of algorithms, information and computation
 Computing, any goal-oriented activity requiring, benefiting from, or creating computers
 Computer engineering (called technical informatics), the creating of computing hardware
 Information science, an interdisciplinary study of information
 Data science, the field related to data analysis and data engineering
 Information technology, the study, design, development, implementation, support, or management of computer-based information systems,
 Cognitive science, study of information processing in natural systems (called 'cognitive informatics')
 Computational science, solving computational problems in natural sciences
 Information engineering
 Engineering informatics (not to be confused with informatics engineering, Southern European term)
 Library science

Other uses 
 Informatics General, previously Informatics, Inc., leading independent software company 1962-1985
 Informatics Europe, an association for European PhD-granting computer and information science departments
 Informatics for Consumer Health, a U.S. governmental health body
 Informatics Corporation of America, a U.S. healthcare information company 
 Informatics Forum, major building at University of Edinburgh 
 Informatics.nic.in, a quarterly e-Governance publication
 Informatics Institute of Technology, educational entity in Sri Lanka
 Informatics Philippines, an educational institution

See also
 Informetrics
 Info-metrics